Sir Cary Lynn Cooper  (born 28 April 1940), is an American-born British psychologist and 50th Anniversary Professor of Organizational Psychology and Health at the Manchester Business School, University of Manchester.

Before moving to Manchester he was Distinguished Professor at Lancaster University. Cooper was Head of the Manchester School of Management (within UMIST) from the early 1980s. In 1995 he became Pro-Vice-Chancellor and then Deputy Vice-Chancellor of UMIST until 2002. From 1979 to 1980 he was chairman of the Management Education and Development Division of the Academy of Management and was elected as Founding President of the British Academy of Management. In June 2005 he was appointed head of the Sunningdale Institute, which, managed by the United Kingdom National School of Government, brings international academics and industry figures together to advise on issues facing UK public sector organisations. He was chair of the Academy of Social Sciences, a body representing over 88,000 social scientists and 46 learned societies in the social sciences (including the Royal Geographical Society, British Psychological Society, the Political Studies Association, and the Royal Statistical Society).  In 2010 he was chair of the Chronic Diseases and Mental Health Global Agenda Council of the World Economic Forum. He is immediate past president of Relate, Clinical Advisor to Anxiety UK,Past President of the Institute of Welfare, President of the Chartered Institute of Personnel and Development 2016–2021, Chair of the National Forum for Health & Wellbeing at Work (2016-) and past president of the British Association for Counselling and Psychotherapy. Cooper was a director of well-being specialists and business psychologists at Robertson Cooper Limited, a university spin off company which he set up in 1999 with Ivan Robertson. He was the founding editor-in-chief of the Journal of Organizational Behavior.

Cooper's parents were Jews from Romania and Ukraine who settled in West Hollywood. He became a British citizen in 1993.

Education 
Cooper has obtained a BSc (UCLA), an M.B.A. (UCLA), and a PhD (Leeds University, UK).

Recognition 
Cooper has received the following awards from professional and academic organisations:
 1994 Fellow of the British Academy of Management
 1994 Elected a Fellow of the (British) Institute of Management
 1997 Elected by the (American) Academy of Management as one of the first UK Fellows
 1997 Became a Companion of the Institute of Management (now the Chartered Management Institute)
 1998 Awarded the Distinguished Service Award by the (American) Academy of Management for services to the field of management
1998 Awarded an Honorary Doctorate of Letters from Heriot-Watt University (Edinburgh) for contributions to organizational psychology
1999 Awarded an Honorary Doctorate of Business Administration by Wolverhampton University
2002 Awarded an Honorary Doctorate of Science by Aston University
2003 Awarded an Honorary Doctorate by Middlesex University
2005 Cooper was elected as an Honorary Fellow of the Faculty of Occupational Medicine of the Royal College of Physicians
2006 Cooper was made Hon Fellow of the Royal College of Physicians
2008 Awarded Hon Fellow of the British Psychological Society
2008 Cooper was made an Hon Fellow of the Faculty of Occupational Medicine of the Royal College of Physicians of Ireland
2008 Cooper was selected as chair of the Academy of Social Sciences (body of nearly 90,000 social scientists and 47 learned societies).
2009 Cooper was appointed chair of the Chronic Diseases Global Agenda Council of the World Economic Forum.
2010 Awarded the Lord Dearing Lifetime Achievement Award for Higher Education by THE
2011 Awarded an Honorary Doctor of Science by University of Sheffield
2012 Awarded Hon Fellowship of the Institution of Occupational Safety and Health
2014 Awarded an Honorary Doctor of Laws by Bath University
2014 Elected as President of the British Academy of Management
2015 Elected as CIPD President
2017 Awarded an Honorary Doctor of Science by the University of Chester
2018 Awarded the WFPMA Petitpas Award for Distinguished Service to the Global HR Profession by the World Federation of People Management Associations, Chicago.
2019 Awarded the Chris Arygris Lifetime Achievement Award by the Academy of Management, Boston.
2019 Awarded an Honorary Doctor of Education by the University of Bolton
2020 Winner of the New York City Big Book Award for the Book of the Year in Marketing & PR for The Apology Impulse
2021 Awarded Companion of the Chartered Institute of Personnel and Development
2021 Awarded ISMA Federation International Medal for lifetime achievement, India
2022 Endowed Chair and Lecture Theatre named after Sir Cary Cooper at Woxsen University, India
2022 Patron, International Stress Management Association
2023 Awarded a Lifetime Achievement Award by the IOBC in Israel on January 3,2023.

Queen's Birthday Honours 
Cooper was appointed Commander of the Order of the British Empire (CBE) in the 2001 Birthday Honours for his contribution to occupational/organizational health and was Knighted in the 2014 Birthday Honours for services to social science.

Media work 
Cooper has been described as the media's first choice for comment on workplace issues, and is often interviewed by the UK press (including BBC and ITV) for both news and current affairs.

See also
 Organizational Wellbeing
 Workplace stress
 Workplace bullying
 Women in the workforce
 Work-life balance
 Hours of work
 Gender pay gap
 4 day working week

Selected bibliography 
"The Cambridge Companion to Organizational Stress & Wellbeing"(with Laurent Lapierre, Cambridge University Press, 2023)
Law Enforcement, Leadership & Wellbeing: Creating Resilience" (with Ian Hesketh, Palgrave Macmillan,2023)
"Occupational Health & Wellbeing" (with Andrew Kinder & Rick Hughes, Routledge, 2023)
"Myths of Management: Dispel the Misconceptions" (with Stefan Stern, Kogan Page, 2023).
"Burnout While Working" (with Michael Leiter, Routledge, 2023)
"Remote Workplace Culture" (with Sean O'Meara, Kogan Page, 2022)
"Organizational Stress Theories" (with Kimberly E. O'Brien, Edward Elgar, 2022)
"Managing Workplace Health & Wellbeing During a Crisis" (with Ian Hesketh, Kogan Page, 2022)
"The Healthy Workforce" (with Stephen Bevan, Emerald Publishers, 2022)
"A Research Agenda for Workplace Stress & Wellbeing" (with Kevin Kelloway, Routledge, 2021)
"The SAGE Handbook of Organizational Wellbeing" (with Tony Wall & Paula Brough, Sage, 2021)
"Psychological Insights for Understanding COVID-19 and Work" (Routledge, 2021)
"Organizational Stress Around the World: Research and Practice" (with Kajal Sharma & D.M. Pestonjee, Routledge, 2021)
"Brexit in the Workplace: A Psychology of Survival" (with Ashley Weinberg & Alexander-Stamatios Antoniou, Edward Elgar Pub, 2020)
"Flexible Work: Designing Our Healthier Future Lives" (with Sarah Norgate, Routledge, 2020)
"Navigating the Return to Work Experience for New Parents" (with Maria Karanika-Murray, Routledge, 2020)
"Work & Stress: A Research Overview" (with Philip Dewe,Routledge,2020)
"The Apology Impulse" (with Sean O'Meara, Kogan Page, 2019)
"Current Issues in Work & Organizational Psychology (Routledge, 2019)
"Handbook of Research on the Psychological Contract at Work" (with Yannick Griep, Edward Elgar Publ, 2019)
"Wellbeing at Work" (with Ian Hesketh, Kogan Page, 2019)
"Presenteeism" (with Luo Lu, Cambridge University Press, 2018)
"The Myths of Management" (with Stefan Stern, Kogan Page, 2018)
"21st Century Workforces and Workplaces" (with Bevan, Brinkley & Bajorek, Bloomsbury, 2018)
"Boards that Dare" (with Marc Stigter, Bloomsbury, 2018)
"Managing Health and Wellbeing in the Public Sector" (with Ian Hesketh, Routledge, 2017).
"The Spartan Worker" (with Kostas Perrotis, Routledge, 2017).
"Handbook of Stress and Health" (with James Quick, Wiley Blackwell, 2017).
"The Outstanding Middle Manager" (with Gordon Tinline, Palgrave Macmillan, 2016)
"Stress in the Construction Industry" (with Leung and Chan, Wiley Blackwell, 2015).
"Solving the Strategy Delusion" (with Marc Stigter, Palgrave Macmillan, 2015).
"Wellbeing: The Complete Reference Guide (6 volumes), Wiley Blackwell, 2014. 
"Building Resilience for Success. (with Jill Flint-Taylor and Michael Pearn), Palgrave-Macmillan, 2013.
"High Engagement Work Culture: Balancing WE and ME. (with David Bowles), Palgrave-Macmillan, 2012.S
"Wellbeing: Productivity and Happiness at Work. (with Ivan Robertson), Palgrave-Macmillan, 2011.s
"The Science of Occupational Health". (with Ulf Lundberg), Wiley-Blackwell, 2011.
Employee Morale: Driving Performance in Challenging Times (with David Bowles), Palgrave-Macmillan October 2009
Mental Capital and Wellbeing (with Field, Goswami, Jenkins & Sahakian), Wiley-Blackwell, 2009.
"Managing Executive Health" (with Quick, Gavin and Quick), Cambridge University Press, 2008.
"Happy Performing Managers" (with P. Hosie), Edward Elgar Publ, 2006.
"Business and the Beautiful Game" (with T. Theobald), Kogan Page 2005
 Leadership and Management in the 21st Century: Business Challenges of the Future, Oxford University Press 2004
 The Blackwell Encyclopaedia of Management (Editor, with Associate Editors C Argyris and W H Starbuck), Blackwell 2004
 Stress: A Brief History (with P Dewe), Blackwell 2004
 International Review of Industrial and Organizational Psychology: Vols.1–19 (with I T Robertson), John Wiley and Sons, 1986–2004.
 "Managing the Emotions in Mergers and Acquisitions" (with Dr. V. Kusstascher), Edward Elgar Publ., 2005.
 Work Psychology: Understanding Human Behaviour in the Workplace (with I T Robertson, J Silvester, B Burnes, F Patterson and J Arnold), Financial Times Prentice Hall 2004
 Managing the Safety Risk of Workplace Stress (with S Clarke), Routledge 2003
 "Destressing Doctors" (with Dr. V. Sutherland), Butterworth Heinemann, 2003.

References

External links 
 

British business theorists
Organizational psychologists
Systems psychology
Commanders of the Order of the British Empire
Knights Bachelor
Academics of Lancaster University
American emigrants to England
Living people
Place of birth missing (living people)
Academics of the University of Manchester Institute of Science and Technology
Academics and writers on bullying
Workplace bullying
1940 births
Naturalised citizens of the United Kingdom
American people of Romanian-Jewish descent
English people of Romanian-Jewish descent
American people of Ukrainian-Jewish descent
English people of Ukrainian-Jewish descent